"We Could Go Back" is a song by British DJ and record producer Jonas Blue, featuring vocals from Moelogo. It was released as a digital download on 13 October 2017 via Blue's record label Jonas Blue Music. It’s the fifth single of Blue’s debut album Blue.

Music video
A music video to accompany the release of "We Could Go Back" was first released onto YouTube on 26 October 2017 at a total length of three minutes and forty-four seconds.

Charts

References

 

2017 songs
2017 singles
Jonas Blue songs
Songs written by Edvard Forre Erfjord
Songs written by Henrik Barman Michelsen
Songs written by Jonas Blue
Songs written by Jin Jin (musician)